Tiina Nieminen (born 11 May 1979) is a Finnish former racing cyclist. She won the Finnish national road race title in 2007.

References

External links

1979 births
Living people
Finnish female cyclists
Place of birth missing (living people)